San Carlos Airport  is two miles northeast of San Carlos, California, in San Mateo County, California. The FAA's National Plan of Integrated Airport Systems (NPIAS) classifies San Carlos as a reliever airport for San Francisco International Airport.

The airport is off U.S. Route 101. The airport is home to Civil Air Patrol West Bay Composite Squadron 192. Next to the airport is the Hiller Aviation Museum.

History 
The San Carlos Flying Field was established during World War I by J. Paulding Edwards on a field north of Cordilleras Creek and east of today's Old County Road. A 300 foot long hangar was situated along the western end of Terminal Way. San Carlos' first pilot's license was issued on July 10, 1917 to Lieutenant Prince.

In 1923, the airfield was taken over by the Cooley family. Charles P. Cooley was the primary flight instructor and his father, Frank S. Cooley, operated the field. On July 12, 1940, a fire destroyed the main hangar and twelve aircraft. Operations were maintained on an airstrip bounded by today's Brittan Avenue, Washington Street, Old County Road, and Industrial Road.

Sometime around 1935 the Cooley family established a different airfield near the foot of today's Twin Dolphin Drive in San Carlos. That facility had a 200 ft by 2100 ft runway and a building that housed various industrial activities. The Cooley family eventually determined that the airport needed to be moved because its proximity to the Phelps and Steinberger Sloughs limited the length of the runway.

The Cooleys opened another airfield at the present location of the San Carlos airport in 1948. In 1952 ownership was transferred to Mr. Francis Michaud who renamed it San Carlos-Belmont Airport. Repair and administrative buildings were added and plans were developed to lengthen the runway to 7000 ft. In 1957 the field was renamed San Mateo County Airport, Inc. Ownership was split between Michaud, the Piombo Construction Company, and six other parties. San Mateo County purchased the property in 1964. Today the airport is completely funded with user and business fees and receives no money from the County's General Fund.

Facilities
Its one runway, 12/30, is 2,600 by 75 feet (792 x 23 m) asphalt.

A plan to lengthen the runway by 400 feet was quelled by neighbors in 1999. Aircraft with gross weight in excess of 12,500 lb (5,670 kg) are prohibited.

San Carlos Airport is home to over 30 aviation-related businesses. Facilities and FBOs at KSQL include Bay Aerial Helicopter Service, FlyBayArea, JATO Aviation, Rabbit Aviation Services, Surf Air, Zanette Aviation Insurance, West Valley Flying Club, Diamond Aviation Charter, and the San Carlos Flight Center.

In 2007 the airport had 155,273 aircraft operations, average 425 per day: 98% general aviation, 2% air taxi and <1% military. 372 aircraft were then based at this airport: 86% single-engine, 11% multi-engine, <1% jet and 3% helicopter.

Origin of SQL airport code 

As a backronym, some have speculated that the airport code of SQL is a humorous reference to the nearby headquarters of Oracle Corporation, a maker of database software. In databases, SQL, or Structured Query Language, is used for handling structured data. However, the airport had the code SQL years before Oracle's predecessor, Software Development Laboratories, was incorporated in June, 1977.

Experimental Aircraft Association 
The Experimental Aircraft Association (EAA) has a local chapter at San Carlos Airport. EAA Chapter 20 had about 50 members as of 2010. An on-field flight school typically hosts monthly meetings on the second Saturday of each month.

Accidents and incidents 
 On September 2, 2010, a Beechcraft Queen Air crashed into a nearby lagoon at Oracle headquarters shortly after takeoff from runway 30, killing all three occupants.
 On October 20, 2017, a Cirrus SR-22 overran the end of runway 30, crashing through a fence and onto adjacent Skyway Road upon takeoff. The two occupants suffered only minor injuries.

Proposed runway extension 
In 1999, a proposal was given to extend the runway into the marshy area near Bair Island south of the airport. The proposal encountered opposition among the adjacent residents in Redwood Shores and Foster City, who complained about the potential for increased noise. Despite promises by San Mateo County officials, opponents felt a longer runway would lead to bigger and noisier planes, in particular, more corporate aircraft of the light jet category. As a result, the runway was not extended.

See also
List of airports in the San Francisco Bay Area

References

External links

 San Carlos Airport page at San Mateo County Department of Public Works website
 San Carlos Airport Association
 
 

Airports in San Mateo County, California